Isaac Moura Rocha Airport  is the airport serving Guanambi, Brazil. 

It is operated by Infracea.

History
Since August 15, 2019 the airport is managed by the concessionary Infracea.

Airlines and destinations

Accidents and incidents
3 February 1992: a Nordeste Embraer EMB 110 Bandeirante registration PT-TBB operating flight 92 from Salvador da Bahia to Guanambi descended below minimum levels in bad weather and crashed on a hill hidden by clouds near Caetité. All 12 passengers and crew aboard died.

Access

See also

List of airports in Brazil

References

External links

Airports in Bahia